Ayshalak (English: I Live for You) is the third studio album by Lebanese singer Elissa released by Music Master on 14 June 2002. The album was well received by the public and critics, and achieved great commercial success with sales of 2.95 million copies in 2002. It ranked first in terms of sales in the Arab world upon its release, and remained number one on the charts for six months until mid-December 2002, when it was displaced by Ragheb Alama's album Tab Leh and dropped to second place. Many of the album's songs were translated into songs in other languages, including the titular song "Ayshalak" that was covered in Serbian, Turkish, and Russian. The song "Ajmal Ihssas" has been covered four times by different Turkish artists, including Ferhat Göçer, Firdevs, and Sinan Akçıl.

The music video for "Ayshalak" was filmed in Paris under the direction of director Fabrice Bigotti, which made Elissa the first Arab artist to officially appear in a dress specially designed for her by the fashion house Dior. In September 2002, Elissa received the award for Best Female Singer from the Murex d'Or, and her music video "Ajmal Ihssas" won the Best Music Video Award at the Dubai Music Festival.

Track listing
All tracks arranged by Jean-Marie Riachi, except for "Shiltak Min Albi" and "La Trouh", which were arranged by Nasser El Assaad.

Notes
"Shou El Hal" is an Arabic-language cover of the 2001 Turkish song "Kuzu Kuzu" by Tarkan.

Personnel
Adapted from the album liner notes.
 Edouard Meunier - sound engineer, mixing
 Xavier Escabasse - sound engineer
 Philippe Hervet - guitar
 Chris De Pauw - guitar
 Jihad Aki - violin
 Gerard Ferrer - vocals, Spanish lyrics (tracks 5, 8)
 Alexandre Ubeda - photographer
 Amin Abiyaghi - management

References

Elissa (singer) albums
2002 albums